Diplothele halyi is a species of spider of the genus Diplothele. It is endemic to Sri Lanka. Differences from the type species Diplothele walshi include a large fovea and a less distinct abdominal pattern. The male is more hairy than female, with a slightly elevated spine. It was first described from the Nuwara Eliya area.

See also 
 List of Barychelidae species

References

Araneidae
Endemic fauna of Sri Lanka
Spiders of Asia
Spiders described in 1892